The 1939 Ice Hockey World Championships were held between February 3 and February 12, 1939, in Zürich and Basel, Switzerland.  Austria had been annexed by Germany in 1938, and four Austrians played this tournament in German jerseys.
The fourteen teams participating in the 1939 World Championship were initially divided into four preliminary groups: two groups of four and two groups of three. The top two teams in each group advanced to the second round. The eight teams in the second round played in two groups of four, with the top two from each group advancing to the third (final) round. The six teams not advancing to the second round played a consolation round in two groups of 3 teams with the winners of each group playing a one-game play-off for 9th place.  The four teams not advancing from the second round played a consolation round for placed 5 through 8.

Canada won its eleventh world championship winning all their games while only giving up one goal in the entire tournament.  The USA had lost to the Swiss in the semi-final round, but defeated them in the final to claim silver.  The host, Switzerland, won its third European championship by winning a one-game playoff against Czechoslovakia well after the World Championship had concluded.  Both teams had earned one point in the final round and decided to play tie-breaking game.

The games were held at Kunsteisbahn Margarethen in Basel and Dolder Kunsteisbahn in Zürich.

The 8-1 victory over the Belgian side would be the last victory for Hungary at the World Championships highest level until 2016

World Ice Hockey Championship (in Basel and Zurich, Switzerland)

First round

Group A 

Standings

The Executive Board voted to have Italy and Germany replay their game (February 6 at Zurich), which ended as a scoreless draw, after which goal differential was used to decide second place.

Group B 

Standings

Group C 

Standings

Group D 

Standings

Consolation Round – Places 9 to 14

Group A 

Standings

Group B 

Standings

Consolation round 9–10 Place

Second round

Group  A 

Standings

Group B 

Standings

Consolation Round -- Places 5 to 8 

Standings

Final Round – Places 1 to 4 

Standings

Playoff for 3rd place (and European Championship)

Final Rankings – 1939 World Championships 

World Champion 1939
 Canada

Team Members 
Trail Smoke Eaters

Final Rankings – 1939 European Championships 

European Champion 1939
 Switzerland

Citations

References
Complete results

IIHF Men's World Ice Hockey Championships
International ice hockey competitions hosted by Switzerland
1938–39 in Swiss ice hockey
February 1939 sports events
March 1939 sports events
Sports competitions in Zürich
Sports competitions in Basel
20th century in Zürich
20th century in Basel